Mark Crew (born 21 February 1985) is a songwriter, record producer, and mix engineer based in London, known for
his work with Bastille, Rag'n'Bone Man, and the Wombats.

Production and songwriting
Crew produced the albums Bad Blood (UK #1, 3× platinum sales award; US #11, platinum sales award), Wild World (UK #1, gold; US #4) and Doom Days (UK #4; US #5) for Bastille. The albums included the notable singles "Pompeii" (UK #2, 3× platinum; US #5, 6× platinum), "Of the Night" (UK #2, platinum), and "Good Grief" (UK #13, platinum; US #40).

He developed Rag’n’Bone Man and produced a number of tracks on his debut album Human (UK #1, 4× platinum; France #1, 3× platinum; Germany #2, platinum), including the singles "Bitter End" and "Grace." He produced The Wombats albums Glitterbug (UK #5, 1x silver; US #91) and Beautiful People Will Ruin Your Life (UK #3), and also produced the James Arthur single "Empty Space" (UK #22, 1x silver), the Louis Tomlinson single "Two of Us", the Freya Ridings single "Castles" (UK #16, 1x silver) and the James Blunt single "Champions".

The two mixtapes that preceded Bastille's debut album campaign, titled Other People's Heartache Parts I & II, were also produced by Crew. One track from these mixtapes, "Of the Night", was the launch single for the extended version of the album, All This Bad Blood. The song charted at #2 in the UK, and has sold over 1.5 million downloads to date.

After Bad Blood, he produced a further Bastille mixtape titled VS., an eight-song set continuing in the vein of the previous mixtapes, featuring appearances from Lizzo, Angel Haze, and Haim.

He went on to produce Bastille's second album, Wild World. He also mixed 13 titles on the album. Wild World was released on 9 September 2016 and spent two weeks at number 1 on the UK album charts and reached number 4 in the US Billboard 200 charts.  The lead single from the album, "Good Grief", spent 23 weeks on the UK Singles Chart and was certified with a Gold sales award.

The first single from Bastille's third studio album, titled "Quarter Past Midnight", was produced at Crew and Dan Smith's studio in London, One Eyed Jack's and was Annie Mac's Hottest Record on 9 May 2018.

Crew also produced the third album from The Wombats. Titled Glitterbug, it was released on 13 April 2015. The first two singles from the album, "Greek Tragedy" and "Give Me a Try", were both Zane Lowe's Hottest Records and play-listed on Radio 1. The album entered the UK albums chart at number 5, and the Australian albums chart at number 2. The Wombats invited Crew back to produce their fourth album, Beautiful People Will Ruin Your Life. The album was produced at his studio. Released on 9 February 2018, the album entered the UK charts at number 3 and the Australian charts at number 5. The singles from the album, "Lemon to a Knife Fight", "Cheetah Tongue", and "Turn", were all selected as Annie Mac's Hottest Records.

Crew co-wrote and co-produced Tears For Fears' song "I Love You but I'm Lost" and mixed the band To Kill a King's self-titled album, producing the tracks "Oh My Love" and "Breathe".

Best Laid Plans
In 2013, Crew founded Best Laid Plans Records with production partners Dan "Braque" Priddy and Dan Smith and Best Laid Plans Music, a music publishing imprint.

The first artist to be produced for Best Laid Plans was Rag'n'Bone Man. The campaign commenced with a mini-album titled Wolves, which featured contributions from Vince Staples, Kae Tempest, and Stig of the Dump. This was followed by the Disfigured EP in March 2015, which included "Bitter End", a track that was performed live at Glastonbury and play-listed for BBC Radio 1. Rag'n'Bone Man is signed to Columbia Records. Crew produced ten tracks on Rag'n'Bone Man's debut album with his production partner and label co-director Dan "Braque" Priddy. Titled Human, it was released on 10 February 2017 and sold 117,000 copies in the UK in its first week of release, becoming the "fastest-selling male debut album of the decade."

The second artist to be signed to Best Laid Plans was Rationale, whose debut EP Fuel to the Fire gained early support from Annie Mac, Huw Stephens and Phil Taggart on BBC Radio 1, and Zane Lowe and Pharrell Williams on Beats 1. Two tracks from the EP, "Fuel to the Fire" and "Fast Lane", were play-listed on Radio 1. Subsequent single "Something for Nothing" was a 'Hottest Record' and also play-listed on BBC Radio 1. Crew mixed all titles on Fuel to the Fire and provided additional production on "Something for Nothing".

As of July 2020, Best Laid Plans represents the following seven artists: Rag'n'Bone Man, Rationale, Kianja, The Dawn of May, Akine, FERDIN&ND, and Flying Ibex.

Selected discography

Singles

Albums and EPs

References 

1985 births
Living people
English record producers
English songwriters
Mixing engineers